The Never Summer Mountains are a mountain range in the Rocky Mountains in north central Colorado in the United States consisting of seventeen named peaks. The range is located along the northwest border of Rocky Mountain National Park, forming the continental divide between the headwaters of the Colorado River in Rocky Mountain National Park to the local-east and the upper basin of the North Platte River (North Park) to the local-west; the continental divide makes a loop in these mountains. The range straddles the Jackson-Grand county line for most of its length, and stretches into Jackson and Larimer county at its northern end. A panoramic view of the range is available from sections of Trail Ridge Road in Rocky Mountain National Park. One of the northernmost peaks, Nokhu Crags, is prominently visible from the west side of Cameron Pass.

Geology
The rocks of Never Summer Mountains are younger than most of the surrounding mountain ranges.  They, along with the Rabbit Ears Range to the west, were formed by volcanic and intrusive processes 24–29 million years ago and consist mostly of igneous granitic formations along with preceding metamorphic formations.  Most of the highest peaks in the range are granodiorite that was uplifted during the Miocene epoch.  The range's highest summit, Mount Richthofen, is the remnant of an andesite volcanic plug.  The Nokhu Crags in the north are mostly Pierre Shale dating from Cretaceous times.  A large thrust fault underneath the Kawuneeche Valley thrust older Precambrian rocks on top of the younger Cretaceous rocks on the east side of the range.  The southern peaks are Miocene-aged granite, and finally Precambrian-aged biotite gneiss and schist.

Beginning two million years ago, glaciers began carving the jagged peaks of the Never Summer Mountains.  Successive waves of glaciation continued to reshape the mountains until the Pinedale Glaciation ended twelve-thousand years ago.

The peaks are enormous weathered masses of granitic rock heavily covered with green and orange lichens surrounded on all sides by large fields of talus shed from the original peaks.  Many alpine lakes are nestled amongst the peaks.  Most vegetation is low-growing and stunted.  Few trees grow at the higher altitudes and Krummholz abounds.

History
In 1879 prospectors discovered silver on Mount Shipler, starting a small mining rush. Other small settlements were founded in the area, including Dutchtown, located high in Hitchens Gulch. The population swelled as high as 5,000 miners and business owners catering to those miners. However, low grade ore, combined with difficult transportation and lack of a local smelter to process the ore, conspired against the boom. By late 1883 the mining rush ended and the miners moved on. The last miners in Dutchtown left by 1884. Today remnants of the towns and mines are accessible by hiking trails.

In 1890 a project called the Grand Ditch began.  The ditch is a  water diversion project.  Streams and creeks that flow from the highest peaks are diverted into the ditch, which flows over La Poudre pass, delivering the water into the Atlantic Basin for the use of eastern plains farmers.  The ditch wasn't completed until 1936.  The ditch diverts between 20 and 40% of the runoff from the Never Summer Mountains  and significantly impacts the ecology in the valley below.  In May 2003 a  section of the ditch breached causing the water to cascade down the slopes and into the Colorado River.  The flood left a visible scar on the mountainside.

In 1914, members of the Arapaho tribe were brought to the region in a trip sponsored by the Colorado Mountain Club.  The tribe members spent their youth in the area and were asked to offer the Native American names for the various peaks, lakes and other geographic features in the area.  They called the range Ni-chebe-chii, which translates to Never No Summer.  Locals eventually settled on Never Summer Mountains for the range.

Many of the peaks in the range are named after cloud types, such as Mount Cirrus and Mount Cumulus.

Recreation
The range is frequented by hikers and backpackers in the summer, and skiers and snowshoers in the winter.  The area sees some mountaineering activity, but the rock tends to be rotten (or choss) and the routes are dangerous.  The Colorado River Trailhead in Rocky Mountain National Park has trails that lead to the Grand Ditch and remains of Lulu City.  Trails from Cameron Pass lead to the Michigan Lakes, Lake Agnes and the Nokhu Crags area.  Trails in nearby Routt National Forest lead to the Never Summer Wilderness on the western and southern edges of the range.

Mountain Peaks
 Baker Mountain
 Bald Mountain
 Bearpaws Peak
 Blue Ridge
 Bowen Mountain
 Braddock Peak
 Cascase Mountain
 Fairview Mountain
 Flat Top Mountain
 Gravel Mountain
 Green Knoll
 Howard Mountain
 Iron Mountain
 Jackstraw Mountain  

 Lead Mountain
 Little Yellowstone
 Lulu Mountain
 Mineral Point
 Mount Cindy
 Mount Cirrus
 Mount Cumulus
 Mount Mahler
 Mount Nimbus
 Mount Neota
 Mount Richthofen
 Mount Stratus
 Never Summer Peak
 Nokhu Crags
 Parika Peak
 Porphyry Peak
 Radial Mountain
 Red Mountain
 Ruby Mountain
 Seven Utes Mountain
 Shipler Mountain
 Specimen Mountain
 Static Peak
 Teepee Mountain
 Thunder Mountain

References

External links
 Rocky Mountain National Park, Geology Field Notes
 Local Backcountry Advocacy
 100 Summits

Ranges of the Rocky Mountains
Mountain ranges of Colorado
Landforms of Jackson County, Colorado
Landforms of Grand County, Colorado
Rocky Mountain National Park